Malaysia participated in the 2011 Asian Winter Games in Almaty and Astana, Kazakhstan from 30 January 2011 to 6 February 2011.

Figure skating
 
Malaysia send 2 figure skaters.

Ice hockey

Men's tournament
Malaysia send a men's hockey team. Malaysia was in the premier division.

Team roster

Abdul Hakim Ismail
Ahmad Bazli Abu Safian
Allan Yeoh Keong Yau
Andy Chang Yew Ming
Aris Samad Yahaya
Brandon Tan Wai Kin
Edmond Ng Eng Kuan
Gabriel Ong Meng Huei
Haniff Mahmood
Jamil David Ahmad Mokhtar
Jeremy Chee Tack Hoong
Khoo Seng Chee
Loke Ban Kin
Moi Jia Yung
Reezman Isa
Tan Kay Seng
Tan Khia Peng
Tengku Muhammad Azlly
Vincent Matthew Loh
Yap Eu Jin

Head coach: Martin Koloc

Premier Division

References

Nations at the 2011 Asian Winter Games
Asian Winter Games
Malaysia at the Asian Winter Games